Bhavani (born 9 November 1953), an Indian film and television actress best known for her work in Malayalam, Kannada, Tamil and Telugu cinema. She was the lead actress in the Telugu film industry.

Personal life
Born in Chennai and was married Malayalam producer/music director Reghu Kumar, known for films like Thalavattam  and Hello My Dear Wrong Number. They had two daughters: Bavitha and Bhavana. She made a comeback through the Malayalam film Thandavam. Currently, she is acting in Tamil serials. She is a granddaughter of Telugu actress singer Rushyendramani. Her mother tongue is Telugu.

Career 
Bhavani's debut film was the Kannada-language Bhootayyana Maga Ayyu (1974), which won her the Best Actress award and in which she shared screen space with legendary actress, mentor and  maternal grandmother Rushyendramani, who received the Best Supporting Actress award for the same film. With 75 films in a span of four years to her credit, Bhavani was considered as one of the leading actresses during the 1970s in the Tamil, Kannada, Telugu and Malayalam film industries.  She also has the distinction of acting with veteran actors like Prem Nazir, Jayan, and Sukumaran in Malayalam, Vishnuvardhan and Rajinikanth in Kannada, R. Muthuraman, Jaishankar, M. G. Ramachandran, and Sivaji Ganesan in Tamil, and N. T. Rama Rao, Chandramohan, Nandamuri Balakrishna, and Sridhar in Telugu.  She was noted for her performance in the Malayalam movie Lisa. Currently she is busy in TV series doing mother and negative roles.

Filmography

Malayalam

 Kalabham  (2006) .... Lakshmi (Lachu)
 Pauran (2005) .... Lalithambika 
 Katha  (2005) .... Nandhan's mother
 Kerala House Udan Vilpanakku (2004) .... Dinesh's mother
Kanninum Kannadikkum (2004) .... Abhirami's mother
 Balettan (2003) .... Devaki's mother
 Thandavam (2002)  .... Swaninathan's wife
 Narendran Makan Jayakanthan Vaka (2001) .... Vinodhini's mother
 Muthuchippikal (1980) .... Devu
 Saraswatheeyaamam (1980) .... Shalini
 Pratheeksha (1979)
 Pambaram (1979).... Geetha
 Sarppam (1979) .... Saheera
 Vaaleduthavan Vaalaal (1979)
 Anupallavi (1979) .... Malini
 Mochanam (1979) .... Jaanu
 Pareeksha (1979)
 Sarapancharam (1979) .... Malli
 Ival Oru Nadodi (1979)
 Ithaa Oru Theeram (1979) ..... Valsala
 Maamaankam (1979) .... Suhara
 Neelathamara (1979) .... Ratnam
 Choola (1979)
 Pichipoo (1978)
 Ashtamudikkayal  (1978)
 Mattoru Karnan (1978)
 Lisa(1978) ... P Lakshmi
 Ammuvinte Attinkutti(1978)
 Sthree Oru Dukham (1978)
 Ninakku Njaanum Enikku Neeyum (1978) .... Lakshmi
 Kalpavriksham (1978) .... Sreedevi - Debut in Malayalam

Kannada

 Bhootayyana Maga Ayyu (1974) - Debut in Kannada
 Onde Roopa Eradu Guna (1975)
 Nagakanye (1975)
 Manthra Sakthi (1975)
 Koodi Balona (1975)
 Kalla Kulla (1975)
 Apoorva Kanasu (1976)
 Mangalya Bhagya (1976)
 Shani Prabhava (1977)
 Sri Renukadevi Mahathme (1977)
 Sahodarara Savaal (1977)
 Bhanasankari (1977)
 Vamsha Jyothi (1978)
 Srimad Virata Parvam (1979)
 Phaniyamma (1983)
 Shiva Kanye (1984)
 Olave Baduku (1984)
 Goonda Guru (1984)
 Nagara Mahime (1984)
 Male Banthu Male (1984)
 Vajra Mushti (1985)
 Guru Jagadguru (1985)
 Jagadeka Veera (1991)
 Upendra (1999)
 Entha Lokavayya (2002)
 Devaru Varavanu Kotre (2002)
 Rhaatee (2015)

Tamil
 Uzhaikkum Karangal (1976) .... Kumari Pankajam - Debut in Tamil
 Bhadrakali (1976) .... Jayanthi
 Sahodara Sapatham (1977)
 Aasai Manaivi (1977)
 Oruvanukku Oruthi (1977)
 Sonnathai Seiven (1977)
 Punniya Boomi (1978)
 Alli Darbar (1978)
 Varuvan Vadivelan (1978)
 Aval Oru Pachaikuzhandhai (1978)
 Chinna Chinna Veedu Katti (1980)
 Erattai Manithan (1982) ... Bhavani
 Marikozhundhu (1991) ... Ezhuthu
 Maravan (1993)
 Vandicholai Chinraasu (1994)
 Sillunu Oru Sandhippu (2013)

Telugu
Vanaja Girija (1976)
 Seeta Geeta Daatithe (1977)...Deepa
 Sri Madvirata Parvam (1977)...Uttara

Television

References

 https://www.youtube.com/watch?v=BWf7fBZ2SX8
 http://cinidiary.com/peopleinfo.php?pigsection=Actor&picata=2&no_of_displayed_rows=2&no_of_rows_page=10&sletter=B

External links

Bhavani at MSI

Actresses in Tamil cinema
Indian film actresses
Actresses from Chennai
Actresses in Telugu cinema
Actresses in Kannada cinema
Living people
20th-century Indian actresses
Actresses in Malayalam cinema
Actresses in Malayalam television
Indian television actresses
21st-century Indian actresses
1968 births
Actresses in Telugu television
Actresses in Kannada television
Actresses in Tamil television